West Wing Aviation is a Queensland based airline that was founded in 2000 and commenced operations on 2 May 2000.

History
The founder and CEO of the company, Peter Collings, owned airline operations running in Queensland dating back to 1992. After the company grew, Peter decided to split away from the company to start West Wing Aviation in 2000, which would provide small commute flights from the Queensland area.

During the 2015 season, another Queensland based airline, Skytrans Airlines shut down on 2 January 2015. A few days later, West Wing Aviation was requested to temporarily continue the Cape York flights in Queensland in order to prevent the isolation of remote towns. Later on 23 March 2015, a deal was made that Skytrans would be purchased under the West Wing Aviation brand and would be resurrected. It was announced that flights for Skytrans would resume on 1 April 2015 under a new brand, recovering some of its previous staff and leasing two Bombardier Dash 8 aircraft.

Destinations 
All West Wing Aviation flights throughout the Torres Strait and Cape York regions are now operated by sister company Skytrans Airlines

Fleet
The West Wing Aviation current fleet consists of:

See also
List of airlines of Australia

References

Australian companies established in 2000
Airlines established in 2000
Companies based in Queensland
Regional Aviation Association of Australia